"Man or Mouse" is a song by the Swedish punk rock band Millencolin from the album Home from Home. It was released as a single on 30 September 2002 by Burning Heart Records, including two B-sides from the album's recording sessions, "Bull By the Horns" and "Into the Maze". The single is an enhanced CD, with the data portion containing the music videos for "Man or Mouse" and "Kemp".

Track listing
"Man or Mouse"
"Bull By the Horns"
"Into the Maze"
The data portion of the enhanced CD includes the music videos for "Man or Mouse" and "Kemp" in MPEG format.

Personnel

Millencolin
Nikola Sarcevic - lead vocals, bass
Erik Ohlsson - guitar
Mathias Färm - guitar
Fredrik Larzon - drums

Millencolin songs
2002 singles
2002 songs
Burning Heart Records singles
Songs written by Mathias Färm
Songs written by Nikola Šarčević
Songs written by Fredrik Larzon
Songs written by Erik Ohlsson (musician)